Alphonse Tavernier (1852–1933) was a French painter and Provençal poet.

Early life
Alphone Tavernier was born on November 27, 1852 in Saint-Cannat.

Career
Tavernier was a painter and Provençal poet.

In 1896, he did an oil painting entitled Vue générale de Saint Cannat en 1896. It is exhibited at the Musée Suffren-Saint Cannat.

Death
Tavernier died in 1933.

References

1852 births
1933 deaths
People from Bouches-du-Rhône
French painters
French poets
Occitan-language poets